The Holy Monastery is a former Eastern Orthodox monastery that is part of the Meteora monastery complex in Thessaly, central Greece.

Names
Other names for monastery include:

Nea Moni (Νέα Μονή) 'New Monastery'
Moni Genesiou tes Theotokou (Μονή Γενεσίου της Θεοτόκου) 'Monastery of the Birth of the Theotokos'
Moni ton Eisodion tis Teokokou (Μονή των Εισοδίων της Θεοτόκου) 'Monastery of the Entry of the Theotokos'
Keli tou Varlaam (Κελί του Βαρλαάμ) 'Cell of Varlaam'

Description
The monastery was mentioned in 1614, which at the time was inhabited by more than 20 monks. The monastery had also sought to gain recognition as a stavropegion. Today, only ruins remain on a narrow rock that is overshadowed by Ypsilotera Rock.

The Cave of St. Athanasius of Meteora is located next to the Holy Monastery.

Gallery

References

Meteora